Spy Handler is a 2004 nonfiction book by Victor Cherkashin. Victor Cherkashin recruited American spies Robert Hanssen and Aldrich Ames to work for the USSR's KGB.

Notes

2004 non-fiction books